Sahbirin Noor is an Indonesian politician and current the governor of South Kalimantan. He vice governor Rudy Resnawan rebounded after having initially looked poised to lose the gubernatorial election in 2015. Noor has taken the initiative to rehabilitate about sixty-thousand hectares of degraded land in the province.

References

Governors of South Kalimantan
Indonesian Muslims
Living people
People from Banjarmasin
1967 births